Chomphu, Lampang is a village and tambon (subdistrict) of Mueang Lampang District, in Lampang Province, Thailand. In 2005 it had a population of 26,803 people. The tambon contains 14 villages.

References

Tambon of Lampang province
Populated places in Lampang province